The Malaysia Hockey League (MHL) is a top league competition for field hockey clubs in the Malaysian hockey league system. There are, at present, seven teams in the Malaysia Hockey League. The competition has been played since 1987. At present also it is sponsored by Tenaga Nasional Berhad.

Current season

The 2020 Malaysia Hockey League is the current season.

Teams

The following teams are participating in 2020 Malaysia Hockey League.

Premier Division

  Terengganu Hockey Team
  Tenaga Nasional Berhad Hockey Club
  UniKL Hockey Club
  Maybank Hockey Club
  TNB Thunderbolts

Division 1

  Nur Insafi HC
  UiTM HC
  ATM Airod HC
  Bukit Jalil Sports School
  Sekolah Sukan Tengku Mahkota Ismail
  Majlis Bandaraya Ipoh HC
  Politeknik Malaysia

Former teams

  Yayasan Negeri Sembilan HC
  DeTas-Yayasan Pahang HC
  Kuala Lumpur City Hall HC
  Bank Simpanan Nasional HC
  MBf
  Dolphins HC
  Sapura Hockey Club
  Kuala Lumpur Hockey Club

History

Origin

The tournament was initiated to revive interest in the sport which was losing spectator interest to football in recent times. Hockey is one of Malaysia's major sports. The field hockey in Malaysia has been the main sport to choose when playing at a high level.

One of the main reasons for the waning popularity of the existing domestic competition was the rise of corporate teams such as Ernst & Young, Tenaga Nasional Berhad and Maybank which do not have a steady fan following. Malaysia Hockey League is trying to change that by bringing in regional flavor. It fields teams from traditional hockey bastions such as Kuala Lumpur, Penang, Malacca, Negeri Sembilan, Perak, other areas, as well as from other places where it has got some fan following.

Founding

The competition was first played in 2000 involving 11 teams. Initiated by Malaysian Hockey Federation (MHF) with active support from sports channel ESPN Malaysia. The first season had two tiers division 1 and division 2 but from 2007 season onwards division 2 was scrapped. Except team winning 2006 division 2 championship rest all teams in division 2 were scrapped.

Competition

New format

The new Malaysia Hockey League (MHL) will see 10 teams vying for glory in the top division. Last year, only six teams competed in Division One and Division Two had nine teams. Under the new format, the elite teams will compete in the Premier Division while the rest will vie for a place in Division One. These two divisions are for the Open category.

Division Two and Division Three will be for the Under-19 age groups and will comprise teams from last year's Malaysia Junior Hockey League (MJHL). Last year's top five Malaysia Hockey League teams — Ernst & Young HC, Sapura HC, Maybank HC, Tenaga Nasional Berhad HC and Nur Insafi HC — will be joined by Jurutera Jentera Letrik HC (JLJ) in the Premier Division.

The competitions committee will select another four teams, based on their strength, for the Premier Division. There are plans to enter the National Juniors (the 2013 Project Team) in the Premier Division. But a decision will be made once the format is approved by the Malaysian Hockey Federation's management committee.

The Division Two champions will have the right to gain promotion to Division One or they can choose to remain in the Under-19 category. The bottom two teams from the Premier Division]will be demoted while the top two from Division One will go up the following year. Division Two and Division Three will kick off in February 2009 while Division One is slated to start in May 2009. The Premier Division will run from October to December 2009.

Malaysia Junior Hockey League return

After 10 months of merging the Malaysia Junior Hockey League (MJHL) with the senior Malaysia Hockey League (MHL), the Malaysian Hockey Federation (MHF) had decided to separate them. The Malaysia Junior Hockey League thus return on the Malaysia Hockey Federation calendar next year, 2010 with the starting date set for 25 March. It will remain an Under-19 tournament.

Players

A team shall consist of a maximum of 18 (eighteen) players to be registered with the Malaysia Hockey Federation.  All 18 players in a team have to be registered with the MHF and need to submit their identity cards before the start of the league qualifying for playing in a team. All Malaysian players currently employed have to be taken on lien for the duration of the league and then be registered with Malaysia Hockey Federation. All the foreign players must obtain International Transfer Certificates from their respective countries and or clubs before signing up with the team in Malaysia Hockey League and Malaysia Hockey Federation.

Import players

There are a number of players from countries other than Malaysia, who have been contracted to play in the league.

List of champions

Champions

By club

Players

Top scorers

Best player

Sponsor
The Malaysia Hockey League become the popular league in Asia because the Malaysia Hockey League has been sponsored by the many big companies:

 AirAsia
 Kappa
 F&N
 Grays
 Chilis

Prize money

The champions of the league will be given MYR 9,000,000 and also the league trophy which was made in 1987.

See also
 Malaysia Junior Hockey League
 Malaysian Hockey Federation
 Malaysia men's national field hockey team
 Malaysia women's national field hockey team

Notes

References

 The Star May 5, 2007
 The Star June 26, 2009

External links 
 

 
 
1987 establishments in Malaysia
Sports leagues established in 1987